The Utrecht Summer School, founded in 1987 by Utrecht University, is the largest academic summer programme in the Netherlands and belongs to the biggest summer schools in Europe. Students from all over the world participate in one of the 170 courses offered. Utrecht Summer School is a cooperation between Utrecht University, Utrecht University of Applied Sciences and the Utrecht School of the Arts. In 2021, Utrecht Summer School celebrated its 35th anniversary. More than 4000 students take part in a summer program per year, making it the largest known summer school in Europe.

History 
The summer school started in 1987 with one course: Dutch Culture and Society, still one of the most popular courses. In the last two decades, the programme developed into a broad selection of courses in virtually all disciplines Utrecht University is offering. There are summer courses organised on location and/or online.

Disciplines 
The courses are divided in seven categories:
 Culture, e.g. Dutch Culture and Society, European Culture
 Art & Music, e.g. Highlights of European Art History, Dutch Golden Age
 Language, e.g. Dutch, English, Chinese Language, Psycholinguistics
 Social Sciences, e.g. Conflict Studies, Migration, Statistics, Data Science
 Business, e.g. Doing Business in Europe, Project Management
 Science, e.g. Mathematics, Programming
 Life Sciences, e.g. Food safety, Biomedical Research, Pharmacoepidemiology
 Law & Economics, e.g. Financial Law, EU Law, Human Rights Law
 Healthcare, e.g. Physiotherapy, Nursing, Clinical Research

Accommodation 
Because accommodation is not easy to find in Utrecht, the summer school offers all participants temporary housing. The accommodations are located throughout the city, within easily accessible distances from various educational institutions.

Social programme 

Utrecht Summer School offers a social programme for all participants. The programme contains city trips through the Netherlands (for example, The Hague), night canoeing through the canals of downtown Utrecht, a weekly social gathering, a pub quiz, (guided) trips to famous museums and an excursion to the Dutch dikes. And, every course starts with a city tour – including a climb up the Dom tower - to introduce students to Utrecht.

References

External links 
 Official website Utrecht Summer School

Summer schools
1987 establishments in the Netherlands
Education in Utrecht (city)